Blondin may refer to:

Antoine Blondin, French writer
Charles Blondin, French tightrope walker 
Denis Blondin, Canadian anthropologist and writer
Ester Blondin, founder of College Marie Anne
Ethel Blondin-Andrew, Canadian politician
Fred Blondin, French singer and songwriter
Yvan Blondin, Canadian Forces General Officer
Maryvonne Blondin, French politician
Pierre Édouard Blondin, Canadian politician
Blondin, the white character from the Belgian comic strip Blondin et Cirage by Jijé